Rosa Otermín Abella (born 2 October 2000) is a Spanish professional footballer who plays as a midfielder for Liga F club Sevilla FC.

Club career
Otermín started her career at EMF Fuensalida.

References

External links
Profile at La Liga

2000 births
Living people
Women's association football midfielders
Spanish women's footballers
People from Alcorcón
Footballers from the Community of Madrid
Atlético Madrid Femenino players
Real Betis Féminas players
Sevilla FC (women) players
Primera División (women) players
Spain women's youth international footballers